Ben Bagley (October 18, 1933 – March 21, 1998) was an American musical producer and record producer.

Career
Born in Burlington, Vermont, Bagley moved to New York during the early 1950s, and in 1955, at age 22, he produced his first hit, Shoestring Revue, starring (among others) Beatrice Arthur and Chita Rivera (and, later, Jane Connell), and with songs by Charles Strouse, Lee Adams, June Carroll, and Sheldon Harnick.

The glowing notices from Shoestring enabled him to mount a more lavish and sophisticated revue, The Littlest Revue Off-Broadway in 1956. This revue featured  the young, unknown Joel Grey, Larry Storch, and Charlotte Rae, as well as Tammy Grimes making her Off-Broadway debut. Contributing lyricists and composers included Vernon Duke, John Latouche, Ogden Nash and others. Particularly memorable was a snappy number by Sammy Cahn and Vernon Duke, called "Good Little Girls." Performed by flame-haired newcomer Beverly Bozeman, this song had originally been written for Bette Davis in a 1952 musical revue, "Two's Company." Resurrecting unused and forgotten songs by major songwriters eventually became a hallmark of Bagley shows and recordings. The Littlest Revue closed after 32 performances, possibly because its venue, the Phoenix Theatre at 2nd Avenue and 12th Street, was too inaccessible for the casual theatergoer. Critics noted the revue's pleasant songs and dull, overlong sketches.

Bagley returned a few months later with Shoestring '57 at the Barbizon-Plaza on Central Park South, and this turned out to be his most successful show yet with 119 performances.

Bagley's Off-Broadway revue The Decline and Fall of the Entire World as Seen Through the Eyes of Cole Porter drew on the composer's lesser-known songs. It ran Off-Broadway from March 1965 to November 1965 for 273 performances at Square East (West Fourth Street), and starred Carmen Alvarez, Kaye Ballard, William Hickey, Harold Lang, and Elmarie Wendel.

Following that, it ran for 13 months in San Francisco, before moving to the regional theater stage. According to Variety, the show "helped pave the way for later Broadway revues like Ain't Misbehavin' and Sophisticated Ladies, which surveyed the work of a single composer."

Shortly after his 1958 revue, Shoestring Revue in Fort Worth, Bagley was diagnosed with tuberculosis. He was hospitalized until 1960.  During this time of sickness and recuperation, he learned what true friendship was and what else he could do with his career.

He began recording albums dedicated to American Popular Song (later collectively referred to as Great American Songbook) and licensed them to various companies, including MGM and RiC in the United States, and CBS in the United Kingdom.

He later founded his own recording label, Painted Smiles Records, and through it reissued those albums and several newer ones, producing 48 albums. The greater part of his record production consisted largely of the "Revisited" series, which promoted the body of work produced by the likes of Richard Rodgers & Lorenz Hart, Oscar Hammerstein II, Jerome Kern, Irving Berlin, Kurt Weill, Cole Porter, Leonard Bernstein, Harold Rome, Howard Dietz & Arthur Schwartz, Frank Loesser, Noël Coward, Harold Arlen, Vernon Duke, Alan Jay Lerner, and DeSylva, Brown, & Henderson.  These albums focused largely upon the composers' lesser-known songs, and contained performances by some of the leading jazz and the theatrical singers of the day (such as Bobby Short and Kaye Ballard), as well as many great theatre and film actors not generally known for their singing ability (among them Katharine Hepburn, Ellen Burstyn, and Laurence Harvey).

The Playbill writer has called Bagley's liner notes for his "Revisited" albums "odd and iconoclastic."  The recordings themselves are "hardly scholarly and sometimes downright unpleasant to listen to (note the antic, drowsy, caffeinated, tinny arrangements and uneven voices — a festival of sharps and flats)."  However, "the discs are nonetheless embraced by fans hungry to explore old, mothballed material by extraordinary songwriters."

Bagley shared credits on his Painted Smiles series with his beloved tom cat, Butch.  Bagley died of emphysema at home in Queens, NY, on March 21, 1998, at age 64.

The Painted Smiles "Revisited" Series
George Gershwin Revisited with Barbara Cook, Bobby Short, Anthony Perkins, and Elaine Stritch.
Leonard Bernstein Revisited with Nell Carter, Estelle Parsons, John Reardon, Chita Rivera, Arthur Siegel, and Jo Sullivan.
Kurt Weill Revisited, vol. 1, with Paula Laurence, Ann Miller, John Reardon, Chita Rivera, Arthur Siegel, and Jo Sullivan.
Kurt Weill Revisited, vol. 2, with Ellen Burstyn, Nell Carter, Blossom Dearie, Tammy Grimes, Estelle Parsons, John Reardon, Arthur Siegel, and Jo Sullivan.
Rodgers & Hart Revisited, vol. 1 with Dorothy Loudon, Danny Meehan, Charlotte Rae, Cy Young, Ann Hampton Callaway, Arthur Siegel, and Sandy Stewart.
Rodgers & Hart Revisited, vol. 2 with Blossom Dearie, Gloria DeHaven, Dorothy Loudon, Bibi Osterwald, Charles Rydell, Bobby Short, Ann Hampton Callaway, Arthur Siegel, Sandy Stewart, Dennis Deal, The Wyss Sisters, Marcus Neville, and Willard Beckham.
Rodgers & Hart Revisited, vol. 3 with Nancy Andrews, Blossom Dearie, Johnny Desmond, Estelle Parsons, Anthony Perkins, Lynn Redgrave, and Arthur Siegel.
Rodgers & Hart Revisited, vol. 4 with Nancy Andrews, Blossom Dearie, Johnny Desmond, Anthony Perkins, Lynn Redgrave, and Elaine Stritch.
Rodgers & Hart Revisited, vol. 5 with Ann Hampton Callaway, Mary Cleere Haran, Dorothy Loudon, Arthur Siegel, Sandy Stewart, and Susan Stroman.
Cole Porter Revisited, vol. 1 with David Allen, Kaye Ballard, Ronny Graham, Bibi Osterwald, Bobby Short, Ann Hampton Callaway, Arthur Siegel, and Sandy Stewart.
Cole Porter Revisited, vol. 2 with Carmen Alvarez, Kaye Ballard, Blossom Dearie, Edward Earle, Laura Kenyon, Karen Morrow, Alice Playten, and Charles Rydell.
Cole Porter Revisited, vol. 3 with Georgia Engel, Helen Gallagher, Dolores Gray, Lynn Redgrave, Arthur Siegel, and Elaine Stritch.
Cole Porter Revisited, vol. 4 with Katharine Hepburn, Blossom Dearie, Helen Gallagher, Dolores Gray, Patrice Munsel, Arthur Siegel, Kaye Ballard, Ann Hampton Callaway, and Sandy Stewart.
Cole Porter Revisited, vol. 5 with Ann Hampton Callaway, Arthur Siegel, Sandy Stewart, Tommy Tune, and Julie Wilson.
Decline And Fall... Cole Porter.
Unpublished, Cole Porter, vol 2.
Jerome Kern Revisited, vol.1 with Barbara Cook, Rod McKuen, Kaye Ballard, Nancy Andrews, Bobby Short, George Reinholt, Harold Lang, Cy Young, Henrietta Valor.
Jerome Kern Revisited, vol.2 with Kaye Ballard, Sheldon Harnick, Anne Meara, Arthur Siegel, Jerry Stiller, Joanne Woodward, John O'Hurley, Jennifer Bassey, Karla Burns, Angelina Reaux, Sarah Rice, Mark Sendroff, Sandy Stewart, Blythe Walker, Karen Wyman.
Jerome Kern Revisited, vol.3 with Kaye Ballard, Dody Goodman, Arthur Siegel, Armelia McQueen, Ann Hampton Callaway, Susan Kreutzer, Bruce Hubbard, Ron Raines, Craig Pomranz, Angelina Reaux, Sarah Rice, Adelle Sardi, Blythe Walker.
Noël Coward Revisited with Laurence Harvey, Hermione Gingold, Nancy Andrews, Edward Earle, Ann Hampton Callaway, Myvanwy Jenn, Barbara Lea, and Arthur Siegel.
Frank Loesser Revisited with Blossom Dearie, Johnny Desmond, Rhonda Fleming, Madeline Kahn, Bibi Osterwald, Gloria Swanson, Margaret Whiting, Jo Sullivan, Colin Romoff, and Emily Loesser.
Irving Berlin Revisited with Richard Chamberlain, Blossom Dearie, Dorothy Loudon, Bobby Short, Ann Hampton Callaway, Arthur Siegel, Sandy Stewart, and William Cantor.
Oscar Hammerstein Revisited with Cab Calloway, Blossom Dearie, Alfred Drake, E.Y. "Yip" Harburg, Dorothy Loudon, Patrice Munsel, Elaine Stritch, and Gloria Swanson.
Alan Jay Lerner Revisited with Blossom Dearie, Dorothy Loudon, Roddy MacDowall, Jerry Orbach, Nancy Walker, Ann Hampton Callaway, Robert Marks, and Arthur Siegel.
Arthur Schwartz Revisited with Charles Rydell, Blossom Dearie, Gloria DeHaven, Phyllis Diller, Warde Donovan, Cab Calloway.
Vernon Duke Revisited with Blossom Dearie, Gloria DeHaven, Tammy Grimes, Anthony Perkins, Rex Reed, Joan Rivers, Jack Haskell.
Harold Arlen Revisited with Nancy Andrews, David Burns, Blossom Dearie, Gloria DeHaven, Phyllis Diller, Estelle Parsons, Charles Rydell, Ann Hampton Callaway, Arthur Siegel, Sandy Stewart.
DeSylva, Brown And Henderson Revisited, vol. 1.
DeSylva, Brown And Henderson Revisited, vol. 2 with Ann Hampton Callaway, Mary Cleere Haran, Dorothy Loudon, Arthur Siegel, Sandy Stewart, Margaret Whiting.
The Grass Harp Lola.
Mostly Mercer.
Too Many Girls.
The Littlest Revue.
Make Mine Manhattan.
Tallulah.
Shoestring Revue.
Shoestring Revue '57.
Contemporary Broadway Revisited.
I Can't Keep Running In Place.
Catch Me If I Fall.
Kay Ballard in The Ladies Who Wrote The Lyrics Kay Ballard.

Notes

References
Painted Smiles Special Offer from ShowMusic.com
"Ben Bagley (1933-1998) Rodgers & Hammerstein Organization
  Bloom, Ken. "The Decline and Fall of The Entire World as Seen Through the Eyes of Ben Bagley." SHOWmusic.  Fall 1996: pp. 42–46, 68

1933 births
1998 deaths
People from Burlington, Vermont
Record producers from New York (state)
American theatre managers and producers
Businesspeople from New York City
20th-century American businesspeople